Thái Bình City is a city in the Red River Delta of northern Vietnam. It is the capital of Thái Bình Province. The city is located 110 km from Hanoi. The city area is 67.7 square km, with a population of 210,000 people (2006).

History

In the 10th century, the area was the domain of the Tran clan, which rose in power to become the Trần Dynasty of Vietnam in the early 13th century. The town Thái Bình (Sino-Vietnamese: 太平) developed near the Keo Pagoda constructed in 1061.

Before the prime minister declared it a city in June 2004, Thai Binh was officially a town. The city is the center of economics and culture in its province. Thai Binh Medical College is considered one of the highest quality medical colleges in Vietnam.

Climate

References

External links

Populated places in Thái Bình province
Provincial capitals in Vietnam
Districts of Thái Bình province
Cities in Vietnam